Jules Mackowiak (12 February 1916 – 30 July 1999) was a French canoeist who competed in the 1936 Summer Olympics.

In 1936 he finished 13th in the K-1 10000 m event while being eliminated in the heats of the K-2 1000 m event.

References

Jules Mackowiak's profile at Sports Reference.com

1916 births
Canoeists at the 1936 Summer Olympics
French male canoeists
Olympic canoeists of France
1999 deaths